Drogheda was a constituency represented in the Irish House of Commons to 1801.

History
There were originally two boroughs named Drogheda, lying on opposite sides of the River Boyne that forms the boundary between County Meath to the south and County Louth (or Uriel) to the north. Sometimes a writ of election was made to the two boroughs separately (Drogheda versus Uriel and Drogheda versus Midiam) and sometimes to the two jointly (Drogheda , "on both sides of the water"). In 1412, the two boroughs were united and, together with their liberties, formed into the "county of the town of Drogheda" separate from Meath and Louth. The county of the town formed a single county borough constituency.

In the Patriot Parliament of 1689 summoned by James II, Drogheda was represented with two members.

Members of Parliament

1689–1801

Notes

References

Citations

Sources
 
 
 

Constituencies of the Parliament of Ireland (pre-1801)
Drogheda
Historic constituencies in County Louth
1800 disestablishments in Ireland
Constituencies disestablished in 1800